The Rasch Baronetcy, of Woodhill in Danbury in the County of Essex, is a title in the Baronetage of the United Kingdom. It was created on 29 August 1903 for Frederic Carne Rasch, Conservative Member of Parliament for South East Essex and Chelmsford. He was succeeded in the baronetcy by his eldest son, also named Frederic but known as 'Carne', as the second Baronet. He was a Colonel in the Army. On Sir 'Carne' Rasch's death the title passed to his nephew, Richard Guy Carne Rasch, the third Baronet. Richard was the son of Brigadier Guy Elland Carne Rasch, the younger son of the first Baronet who had been a gentleman usher to King George VI and afterwards Queen Elizabeth II. The fourth baronet, Sir Simon (Anthony Carne) Rasch, succeeded to the baronetcy in 1996.

Rasch baronets, of Woodhill (1903)
Sir Frederic Carne Rasch, 1st Baronet (1847–1914)
Sir (Frederic) Carne Rasch, 2nd Baronet (1880–1963)
Sir Richard Guy Carne Rasch, 3rd Baronet (1918–1996)
Sir Simon Anthony Carne Rasch, 4th Baronet (born 1948)

References

Kidd, Charles, Williamson, David (editors). Debrett's Peerage and Baronetage (1990 edition). New York: St Martin's Press, 1990, 
 Rasch, Sir Frederic Carne', Who Was Who, A & C Black, an imprint of Bloomsbury Publishing plc, 1920–2016; online edn, Oxford University Press, 2014 ; online edn, April 2014 accessed 14 Dec 2016

Baronetcies in the Baronetage of the United Kingdom